The East Germany men's national under-21 volleyball team represented the East Germany in international men's volleyball competitions and friendly matches under the age 21. It was ruled by the East German Volleyball Federation, that was an affiliate member of the Federation of International Volleyball (FIVB) as well it was a part of the European Volleyball Confederation (CEV).

After German reunification it became a part of United Germany U-21 team.

Results

FIVB U21 World Championship
 Champions   Runners-up   3rd place   4th place

Europe U21 / 20 Championship
 Champions   Runners-up   3rd place   4th place

Team

Past Squads

References

External links

Official website
FIVB profile

National men's under-21 volleyball teams
Volleyball in East Germany